Zev Asher (May 9, 1963 – August 7, 2013) was a Canadian experimental musician and documentary film maker.

Biography
Born in Montreal, Quebec, to a Jewish family. His father Stanley was an compulsive collector of popular cultural artefacts. A mountain of it occupied the basement of the family home. Zev would mine the ephemera; from the pile he found a frame of reference for the media critique implicit in his pioneering noise and multimedia performance group Roughage. He attended M.I.N.D. high school and in 1986 entered the film studies program at Concordia University. He dropped out after being given his first assignment; an essay on Les Unes et Les Autres by Claude Lelouch. Fronting several bands in the city's no wave/punk scene of the early 1980s that he, along with Tim Olive, later revisited in the early 1990s as Nimrod.

Living in Japan with Leah Singer from 1985 to 1987 he became acquainted with the denizens of Tokyo's burgeoning noise scene. Through friendships and collaborations with the artist John Duncan and the noise musician Masami Akita he performed in several noise super groups that were spin offs from Akita's Merzbow project – these included Bustmonsters and Flying Testicle. His Roughage project began here, using a four-track tape recorder he developed techniques for collaging sound recordings. He produced micro editions of these audio cassette collages that were distributed through friends and specialty record stores in Tokyo, a hand made collage was included with each cassette copy. Working with the experimental filmmaker, Mark Nugent, Zev enlarged the scope of Roughage into the multimedia performance unit that included contributions and collaborations with other artists, including Willy Le Maitre, Eric Vasseur. Roughage performances took place throughout Canada, Japan and Europe from the late 1980s to the late 1990s

During one Roughage tour of the newly minted state of Croatia in 1995 he documented and interviewed artists that he met. These interviews provided the basis for his first documentary 'Rat Art: Croatian Independents'. The video looked at artists making art in the context of a society at war.
  
His second feature was called 'What About Me: The Rise of The Nihilist Spasm Band'. The documentary premièred at the Toronto International Film Festival in 2000. Drawing from the inspiration of finding a copy of the Nihilist Spasm Band's first L.P. No Canada in the pile of 1970s ephemera in his family's basement; the documentary explores the legacy of the Canadian noise music pioneers.

The controversy surrounding an art student, Jesse Powers and his infamous act of killing a cat as an art project formed the basis of his third feature documentary Casuistry: The Art of Killing a Cat. The 2004 work, made in collaboration with experimental filmmaker Linda Feesey, explored the limits of what can constitute an artwork. The video also had its  premiere at the Toronto International Film Festival in 2004. The first screening was almost shut down by street protesters alleging that the video condoned cruelty to animals.

His sound collaboration with Norway's Lasse Marhaug materialized as a CD release entitled 'The Romance is Over' by The Sleazy Listeners'.
 
After receiving a diagnosis of CLL in 2003 (chronic lymphocytic leukemia) and going through an ordeal of chemotherapy in Montreal, Zev relocated to Shanghai to work on his documentary on the noise band Torturing Nurse. The work became Subcultural Revolution: Shanghai. Using the social context of the day-to-day lives of the band members; their collective underground project was revealed to be decidedly contrary to the prevailing notions of progress and success that the country was enjoying at the time.

After a relapse of CLL (chronic lymphocytic leukemia), Zev was obliged to return to Montreal for more treatment. Eventually undergoing a stem cell transplant there at Hôpital Maisonneuve-Rosemont . For his final five years Zev struggled with Graft-versus-host disease. His constant ordeal and medical treatments were the subject of his final and incomplete documentary video work Zev Asher:GVH.

Discography

As Nimrod
with Tim Olive and Sam Lohman

As Roughage

As Zev Asher

As Bustmonster
with Masami Akita, Shohei Iwasaki, Fumio Kosakai, Masahiko Ohno, Tetsuo Sakaibara, Yamazaki Maso

As Flying Testicle
with Masami Akita and Yamazaki Maso

As The Sleazy Listeners
with Lasse Marhaug

As Starlet Fever
with Sanja Živković

Filmography

References

 New York Times review of What About Me
 Variety review of What About Me
 New York Times review of Casuistry
 Rotten Tomatoes for Casuistry
 Austin Chronicle review of Casuistry
 Frandroid. Mirha-Soleil Ross. The case for Casuistry.
 BBC review of Sleazy Listeners project
 Philip Fine. Obituary. The Globe and Mail. September 27, 2013.
 Peter Schwenger 'I Remember'. The Globe and Mail. October 11, 2013.

External links
 Nimrod on Bandcamp
 Roughage on Bandcamp
 
 
 

1963 births
2013 deaths
Canadian documentary film directors
Canadian experimental musicians
Film directors from Montreal
Jewish Canadian musicians
Musicians from Montreal
Noise musicians
20th-century Canadian male musicians
Jewish Canadian filmmakers